Jaime Ignacio del Burgo Tajadura (Pamplona, Spain 1942) is a Navarrese lawyer and deputy, a historian and opponent of the inclusion of Navarra in the autonomous Navarra. He has written fourteen books on public rights and the history of Spanish political strife, and a Historia General de Navarra. A former UPN-PP deputy for Navarra, which he represented from 1989-2008, he has chaired the Parliamentary Committee on Constitutional Affairs.

Son of Jaime del Burgo Torres, a Carlist politician. He is married, with six children.

Other information
 Currently living in Switzerland.
 Owns properties in Barcelona.
 Declared insolvent by the Spanish estate.
 Currently involved in the corruption scandal of Bárcenas affair.

References
Biography at Spanish Congress site

Living people
1942 births
Members of the 4th Congress of Deputies (Spain)
Members of the 5th Congress of Deputies (Spain)
Members of the 6th Congress of Deputies (Spain)
Members of the 7th Congress of Deputies (Spain)
Members of the 8th Congress of Deputies (Spain)
Members of the 1st Senate of Spain
Members of the 3rd Senate of Spain
Politicians from Navarre
People from Pamplona
People's Party (Spain) politicians
Presidents of the Government of Navarre